Bicyclus danckelmani is a butterfly in the family Nymphalidae. It is found in eastern Tanzania. The habitat consists of sub-montane and montane forests at altitudes between 800 and 1,800 meters.

Both sexes are attracted to fermented bananas.

References

Elymniini
Butterflies described in 1891
Endemic fauna of Tanzania
Butterflies of Africa